Magic Johnson Theatres is a chain of movie theaters, originally developed in 1994 by Johnson Development Corporation, the business holding of basketball player-turned-entrepreneur Magic Johnson, and Sony Pictures Entertainment through a partnership with Sony-Loews Theatres.

A 1998 merger between Sony-Loews and Cineplex Odeon Corporation caused them to become part of the new Loews Cineplex Entertainment Corp. Magic Johnson worked with Lawrence Ruisi, CEO of Loews Cineplex Entertainment, during the planning and development of these theaters. Currently the chain's former locations are owned by AMC Theatres, after Sony-Loews was acquired by that company in 2006.  Although they are still branded Magic Johnson Theatres, they are solely controlled by AMC.

Earvin "Magic" Johnson, Jr., is no longer actively involved in the management committee, strategic planning, operations, or public relations.

History
The focus of Magic Theatres was to build first-rate multiplexes in urban communities, bringing high quality facilities and technology, as well as job development, encouraging local economic growth. While Magic Theatres are patterned after the Loews Cineplex Entertainment model, they focus on urban markets. After building the Magic Theatre in Harlem, multiple businesses followed suit including Old Navy, Disney, and HMV.

There are/were two multiplex theatres in, or near, major cities of the United States of America, namely in areas which are predominantly African-American and previously were underserved by modern cineplexes.

Johnson brought his understanding of the community to his theater operations.  In his concessions he planned on his customers eating their dinner with the movie adding chicken wings and buffalo shrimp to the selection.  Flavored sodas were added to emulate the Kool-Aid the kids he grew up with would drink at home.

No gang colors or "hanging out" in large groups was permitted in the theaters.  Johnson would personally appear before each movie:

Los Angeles multiplex
The venture dates back to July 1995, when the Magic Johnson Crenshaw 15 opened in the Baldwin Hills Mall in the South region of Los Angeles, California.

It was the first multiplex theatre opened, and was closed in 2010.  It was completely renovated and reopened as the Rave Cinemas Baldwin Hills 15 by the Rave Cinemas chain in 2011. It is now owned by Cinemark Theatres and is renamed the Baldwin Hills Crenshaw Plaza 15 and XD.

Other multiplexes
The only two multiplexes that were opened during the partnership with Magic Johnson, and are still operating, is the AMC Magic Johnson Harlem 9 in Harlem, New York City and the AMC Magic Johnson 12 Capital Center in Largo, MD, a suburb of Washington, D.C.

The Randall Park 12 in Cleveland, Ohio; Northline 12 in Houston, Texas; and Greenbriar 12 in Atlanta, Georgia  — were all closed by AMC due to lack of profitability.

The Magic Theatres Cap Center 12 in Largo, Maryland is still open and operated by AMC Theatres.  The Cap Center 12 was the first multiplex opened that was not a partnership with Magic Johnson.  Loews Cineplex Entertainment had used the Magic Theatres name only to brand the location.

See also

References

External links
Magic Johnson Enterprises website

Movie theatre chains in the United States
AMC Theatres
Theatres
Entertainment companies based in California
American companies established in 1994
Entertainment companies established in 1994
1994 establishments in California
Cinemas and movie theaters in Los Angeles
Cinemas and movie theaters in New York City